Mother Albania is a 12 m statue located at the National Martyrs Cemetery of Albania in Albania, dedicated in 1971.

The statue  represents the country as a mother guarding over the eternal slumber of those who gave their lives for her. There are up to 28,000 graves of Albanian partisans in the cemetery, all of whom perished during World War II. The massive statue holds a wreath of laurels and a star. The cemetery was also the resting place of former leader Enver Hoxha, who was subsequently disinterred and given a more humble grave in another public cemetery.

The statue is made of concrete and it is a work of the sculptors Kristaq Rama, Muntaz Dhrami and Shaban Hadërri. It stands atop a 3-metre pedestal; engraved on the pedestal are the words "Lavdi e përjetshme dëshmorëve të atdheut" ("Eternal glory to the martyrs of the fatherland").

Gallery

See also 

Tirana
Landmarks in Tirana
Tourism in Albania
Albania
History of Albania
National Martyrs Cemetery of Albania

External links 

Monuments and memorials in Albania
National symbols of Albania
National personifications
Colossal statues
1971 sculptures
Outdoor sculptures in Tirana
1971 establishments in Albania